Živa voda (English: "The Living Water") is an album of traditional Serbian songs by the Belgrade group Drina, which accounted for Svetlana Spajić and Minja Nikolić. In the form of a CD it was published by Radio Svetigora from Cetinje, 2000.

The album received very favorable reviews in professional and scientific circles, and Drina was assessed as one of the most successful Serbian traditional music groups. Even after termination of the duo, singers continued cooperation in the Singing Company of Svetlana Spajić.

Track listing 
 Se navali Šar planina (2:33), shepherd's song, region of Šar-planina, Old Serbia 
 Soko pije voda na Vardarot (2:06), Macedonia  
 Red se redat kočanski sejmeni (1:54), Macedonia  
 Gusta mi magla padnala (1:57), Kosovo  
 Zamuči se Božja majka (2:59), Christmas song, village Vukmanovo, South-Eastern Serbia 
 Problejalo mlado jagnje (3:31), shepherd's song 'per bass', village Lasovo, near Zaječar, Eastern Serbia, after singing of Bokan Stanković 
 Tupan mi tupa u selo (1:58), Easter (Veligdenska) song 'per bass', village Vidrovac, near Negotin, North-Eastern Serbia  
 Poranile dve devojke mlade (2:38), harvester's song 'per bass', village Seselac, Eastern Serbia  
 Bela vilo na tebe mi krivo (1:55), 'per bass', village Milatovac, Homolje, Eastern Serbia, after singing of Svetlana Stević  
 Oj, jabuko zeleniko (3:38), ancient wedding song, village Gračanica, Kosovo  
 Ozren goro, povi brdu grane (2:56), song by wedding guest voice, region Ozren mountain, Eastern Bosnia  
 Drinu vodu zatrovale vile (1:04), kantalica, village Culine, Serbian side Drina region  
 Kad se sejo udamo ja i ti (1:23), kantalica, village Donja Pilica, Bosnian side Drina region  
 Zaspala Joka Bogutovka (2:05), 'per voice', village Rastošnica, Bosnian side Drina region  
 Što Morava mutna teče (1:18), kantalica, village Donja Badanja, Jadar, Serbian side Drina region  
 Stojna moma brazdu kopa (2:01), diggers' song, village Gračanica, Kosovo  
 Krajiška kontra (3:31), singing in kolo (circle), Potkozarje, Bosanska Krajina  
 Nema raja bez rodnoga kraja (2:09), 'per bass', Kninska Krajina  
 Gde si bilo jare moje (3:40), shepherd's song, Vranje, South-Eastern Serbia, after singing of Maja Ivanović  
 Drino vodo, žubora ti tvoga (1:34), traditional, Drina, krajiško ojkanje, Kninska Krajina

Publication data 
 Publisher: Radio Svetigora, Cetinje  
 Performers: Svetlana Spajić (leading voice and solo) and Minja Nikolić (back voice).  
 Foreword: Jovan (Ćulibrk) (then monk)  
 Recorded in Boris Kovač studio in Bukovac, February 12–14, 2000, except the tracks 14 and 15, which were recorded in Loznica, November 1999.  
 Ton master: Mare Vukmanović  
 Producer: Boris Kovač  
 Mastering: Vladimir Žeželj  
 Photography: Miroslav Zaklan (Drina) and Milinko Stefanović  
 Makeup: Nataša Bošković  
 Design: Rade Tovladijac and Zoran Tucić  
 Text in Serbian and English and translation: Svetlana Spajić

Critical reception 
At the end of a detailed and favorable album review, esteemed ethnomusicologist and music artist Jelena Jovanović concludes:

References

External links 
 Živa voda (full album), site "Izvorne pesme"  
 „Drina: Živa voda (2000)“, official site of the project with lyrics of all songs, Radio Svetigora, Cetinje.  

2000 albums
Svetlana Spajić albums